Shui Oi is one of the 39 constituencies in the Yuen Long District of Hong Kong.

The constituency returns one district councillor to the Yuen Long District Council, with an election every four years. Shui Oi constituency is loosely based on Tin Oi Court and part of Tin Shui Estate in Tin Shui Wai with estimated population of 17,756.

Councillors represented

Election results

2010s

References

Tin Shui Wai
Constituencies of Hong Kong
Constituencies of Yuen Long District Council
1994 establishments in Hong Kong
Constituencies established in 1994